Ajay Rana (born 23 October 1989) is an Indian cricketer. He made his Twenty20 debut for Himachal Pradesh in the 2016–17 Inter State Twenty-20 Tournament on 2 February 2017. He made his List A debut for Himachal Pradesh in the 2016–17 Vijay Hazare Trophy on 4 March 2017.

References

External links
 

1989 births
Living people
Indian cricketers
Himachal Pradesh cricketers
Cricketers from Himachal Pradesh